In cinema, a trope is what The Art Direction Handbook for Film defines as "a universally identified image imbued with several layers of contextual meaning creating a new visual metaphor". 

A common thematic trope is the rise and fall of a mobster in a classic gangster film. The film genre also often features the sartorial trope of a rising gangster buying new clothes.

Etymology 
The term has the same origin as that of "trope" in the sense of literature, and derived from this. In turn, this came from the Greek  (tropos), "turn, direction, way", derived from the verb τρέπειν (trepein), "to turn, to direct, to alter, to change". Tropes and their classification were an important field in classical rhetoric. The study of tropes has been taken up again in modern criticism, especially in deconstruction. Tropological criticism (not to be confused with tropological reading, a type of biblical exegesis) is the historical study of tropes, which aims to "define the dominant tropes of an epoch" and to "find those tropes in literary and non-literary texts", an interdisciplinary investigation of which Michel Foucault was an "important exemplar".

The use of the term in relation to cinema may be more common in American English than in other dialects.

In film studies
A trope is an element of film semiotics and connects between denotation and connotation. Films reproduce tropes of other arts and also make tropes of their own. George Bluestone wrote in Novels Into Film that in producing adaptations, film tropes are "enormously limited" compared to literary tropes. Bluestone said, "[A literary trope] is a way... of packed symbolic thinking which is specific to imaginative rather than to visual activity... [when] converted into a literal image, the metaphor would seem absurd."

See also
 TV Tropes, a website that catalogues cinematic tropes as well as literary tropes

References

Further reading

Tropes
Filmmaking